"Oochie Coochie" is the lead single released from M.C. Brains' debut album, Lovers Lane. It was produced by Rico Anderson, with Michael Bivins (of New Edition and Bell Biv DeVoe) serving as an executive producer.

The song became a crossover hit, peaking at number 21 on the Billboard Hot 100 while also topping the Hot Rap Singles at number one. The single also achieved a gold certification from the RIAA for sales of 500,000 copies. He later resurfaced in 1996 with his second album, Brainwashed.

Samples used
Chill Rob G - Let The Words Flow
BDP - The Bridge Is Over

Music video
The music video features Boyz II Men and King Wells.

Single track listing

A-Side
"Oochie Coochie" (12" Mix) – 6:49
"Oochie Coochie" (X-Rated Version) – 3:25

B-Side
"Oochie Coochie" (7" Mix) – 3:41
"Oochie Coochie" (Instrumental) – 3:41

Chart history

References 

1991 singles
1991 songs
M.C. Brains songs
Motown singles
Songs written by Michael Bivins